Re Lucking's Will Trusts [1968] 1 WLR 866 is an English trusts law case concerning the duty of care of a trustee, and the requirement to become involved in the governance of companies in which the trust has an interest.

Facts
Two trustees, L and B held 70 per cent of shares in a shoe accessory company, with 20 factory employees, 2 travellers and an agency in France. 29 per cent belonged to L and 1% to his wife. The company directors were Mr and Mrs L, as well as D who managed the business. D wrongfully took £15,000 from the bank account and later went bankrupt, losing the money. The beneficiaries of the trust sued the trustees for breach of their duty of care.

Judgment
Cross J held that the trustees had breached their duty of care, and that they should have become involved in the company's management to prevent the misappropriation of the company's assets taking place. He continued as follows.

Significance
In Bartlett v Barclays Bank Trust Co Ltd, Brightman J interpreted the case as follows.

See also

English trusts law

Notes

English trusts case law
1968 in British law
1968 in case law
High Court of Justice cases